is a Japanese manga series written and illustrated by Nobuyuki Fukumoto. It was serialized in Futabasha's Action Pizazz from 1992 to 1996, and compiled in 11 tankōbon volumes. The series portrays the machinations of men living in the underworld, including speculative stock wars and backroom deals with politicians, deadly struggles for life against vengeful and crazed murderers, and Fukumoto's signature gambling games. After running for 108 chapters, the serialization ended abruptly and discontinued. Gin to Kin has also been adapted into seven direct-to-video movies and a 12-episode television drama.

Characters

Ginji's Group

Portrayed by: Kiyoshi Nakajō (Direct-to-video movies), Lily Franky (TV drama)
He works as a fixer in the underground society under the alias "Silver King". His nickname is "Gin". He has outstanding capabilities in every respect and a unique philosophy of life. He draws Morita into the underworld as a man who fits the "conditions" and expects him to grow and develop his talents. With his demonic train of thought, he squeezes money out of the weak and the wicked, but his greatest ambition is to use powerful politicians such as Izawa to control the country's economic world, believing that it takes a greater evil to defeat evil.

Portrayed by: Kōsuke Toyohara (Direct-to-video movies), Sosuke Ikematsu (TV drama)
Though he was no more than a penniless gambling addict, after being approached by Ginji Hirai at the racetrack, he decides to live in the underworld where the wicked hold on to the money. On one hand, he has the sharpness and genius to see through his opponents' lies and win, but he also possesses monstrous luck, sometimes acting on the principle of profit or loss, which Ginji and the others do not have. He admires Ginji's villainous nature and his genius for acquiring money, and aspires to surpass him by becoming the "gold" to his "silver."

Portrayed by:  (TV drama)
A former member of the Tokyo Metropolitan Police Department. Of all the members, he is often portrayed as trusting Morita in particular.

A former newspaper reporter. Using his experience from the occupation, he supports Ginji by gathering information. He always wears sunglasses and never exposes his face.

Portrayed by: Jun Murakami (TV drama)
A retired public prosecutor who belonged to the Tokyo District Public Prosecutor's Special Criminal Investigation Department and is a broker who deals with companies based on their background. Of all the members, he appears in the story the least.

Portrayed by: Ken Kaneko (Direct-to-video movies)
A young man who joined the group after the horse racing match. Like Morita, he got engrossed in gambling and ended up shouldering a debt of 4 million yen. The resemblance between him and his target, Yōichi Kōno's fourth son, leads Ginji to come up with a secret plan and put the operation into action.

Miscellaneous

Portrayed by: Gorō Ōishi (TV drama)
President of Teinichi Bank. He was caught to be in a collusive relationship by Ginji's group. The collusion was out of the kindness of wanting to support his daughter's marriage partner, Diet member Kaidō. At first he was hostile, but Ginji persuaded him, and from then on, they put their trust in each other and became powerful collaborators.

The number 2 of Takemoto Party, the largest faction of the Constitutional Democratic Party (modeled after the Liberal Democratic Party). He is asked by Morita to help save Ginji and the others, and although he is successfully deceived in the end, he admires Morita's imposing attitude and cooperates with Ginji's team.

Portrayed by: Dankan (TV drama)
The top manager of Marutomi General Business Group, which develops hotels and real estate businesses nationwide. He has a complex about his ugly looks, which is why he is aware that he is a "monkey who does not have money" and believes in the power of cash. However, Ginji rescued him from his role when he was about to go bankrupt after spending most of his assets in a stock purchase war. After Ginji was captured, he introduced Izawa, with whom he had a previous relationship, to Morita.

Portrayed by: Tōru Tezuka (TV drama)
A murderer who has brought about seven serial murder incidents in one city and six prefectures of the whole district of Kanto, and shook the world with atrocities such as cutting the body with the victim still alive.

An art dealer whose business is failing due to the recession. In his early life he was a naive young man who wanted to become a painter after being struck by Paul Cézanne's work in an art museum, but his mind was warped by years of peering into the dark side of the business.

A swindler who reached out to Morita when he was about to be charged an outrageous fee at Nakajō's club. Later, with the promise of splitting the rewards evenly, he went along with Morita's plan, helping him to purchase a counterfeit from a Spanish syndicate.

Portrayed by: Sara Takatsuki (live-action TV series)
A waitress at the coffee shop Morita used to visit. She was the catalyst for the match against Saijō. She is in love with Morita and asks for a relationship with him after the fight is settled, but is declined.

The second son of the president of Saijō Constructions, a first-class corporation. With his mates Arita, the eldest son of the president of a real estate company and Okabe, the eldest son of the president of a pharmaceutical company, they play poker and cheat on young women, keeping their money and bodies in their hands.

Portrayed by: Akira Emoto (TV drama)
The chairman of the massive group "Seikyō," which has risen to the top in one generation, and an old man with a huge amount of wealth. He holds gambling parties for politicians and pays them if they win, and even if they lose, he pays them with a letter of credit with a low interest rate, and cozies up to political power by not charging those who give him something in return for his policies. On the other hand, he calls those who can not pay his bills "domesticated," literally locking them in cages "until they die," feeding them nothing but food and pornographic videos, without even a clock in sight. As a result, he takes great pleasure in watching the destruction of human dignity in modern society while having a drink in hand.

The seventh patriarch of the Kamui family, he is 85 years old and insane enough to be willing to kill his sons for himself and the Kamui family. Prehistoric traditions passed down through the clan forced the brothers to fight with each other, and as a result, a horrible revenge tragedy was born. His given name is derived from Shūhō Satō (same kanji spelling), a manga artist who worked as Fukumoto's assistant at the time.

The eldest son of the Kamui family and a member of the Lower House. Fed up with the patriarchal power that has made the brothers compete with each other, he tries to murder them all. Unlike the other brothers, he is a cunning leader.

The second son of the Kamui family and the governor of G Prefecture. He is weak-minded and only thinks about his own self-preservation. Unlike Katsuteru and Katsuyuki, his spirit is still in the realm of the everyman. He is the only one of his older brothers who is not depicted as bullying Katsuhiro in the past.

The third son of the Kamui family and the president of Kamuy, a major consumer electronics manufacturer. He was told by Katsuhiro that he would make him one of the surviving siblings because he once ran away from home with Katsuhiro when he failed his university entrance examinations, but in reality he was hated because he treated Katsuhiro coldly after the runaway was over.

The fourth son of the Kamui family. He was subjected to bizarre discrimination in his family for more than 20 years due to his poor performance. Together with Kunio, he plots revenge against Hidemine and his brothers.

The fifth son of the Kamui family, who is a half-brother to the above-mentioned brothers and has been kept a secret from everyone around him. He was confined and abused at an early age because he had a mild brain injury and could not go to school, currently living as a manservant. He had never received any affection from anyone but his mother and Katsuhiro. Together with Katsuhiro, they decide to take revenge on the Kamui family.

The nurse in charge of Hidemine who was locked up in the hospital. She becomes Morita's sidekick in the Hidemine rescue mission and takes the lead, but behind the scenes, she is teaming up with the Kamui brothers to lure Hidemine out.

The strongest horseman in Japan with an unprecedented 2,000 victories. He is antagonistic towards Kōno, who has a penchant for money and power, but he initially tries to stop what appeared to be a reckless contest with Kōno. He resonates with Ginji's persuasion and sides with Ginji's camp. He is modeled after Yukio Okabe, a former horseman.

The last boss of the story. He is president of the Constitutional Democratic Party (modeled after the Liberal Democratic Party) and boss of the agro-industrialists. He joins Ginji in a horse race to become the next prime minister. He is modeled after Yōhei Kōno.

Media

Manga

Volume list

|}

Direct-to-video films
A total of seven movies with the title  starring Kiyoshi Nakajō as Ginji Hirai were released on VHS and later DVD between 1993 and 1997. The films feature Kōsuke Toyohara as Tetsuo Morita in volumes 1-5, and Ken Kaneko as Ryōhei Kawamatsu in volumes 6-7. In the fourth volume, some story developments were changed due to inconsistencies in depictions in the original manga.

Drama
A 12-episode Japanese television drama series adaptation with the same title starring Sosuke Ikematsu aired on TV Tokyo's "Saturday Drama 24" drama slot from January 7 to March 25, 2017, every Sunday (Saturday midnight) from 0:20-0:50 AM. Of the 12 episodes, episodes 1 to 3 cover the Stock Speculation arc, 4 to 6 are the Cézanne arc, 7 to 9 are the Poker arc, and 10 to 12 are the Mahjong arc. The series was later made available on Amazon Prime Video US with English subtitles. In addition, a bonus 13th episode adapting the Serial Killer Ariga arc was released exclusively on Amazon Prime Video in Japan on March 25, 2017. A Blu-ray/DVD box containing "director's cut" versions of all 12 episodes, as well as the Amazon-exclusive episode, was released on October 4, 2017. Pre-order bonuses included a mug illustrated by Fukumoto offered by the TV Tokyo main shop, and a B2-sized poster signed by Ikematsu, Lily Franky and Fukumoto offered by Amazon.

Episode list

See also
Gambling in Japan

References

Further reading

External links
 

2017 Japanese television series debuts
Futabasha manga
Anime and manga about gambling
Nobuyuki Fukumoto
Seinen manga
TV Tokyo original programming